The Women's International Motorcycle Association (WIMA) is a motorcycle club established by Louise Scherbyn in 1950 in the  United States. Branches began in many countries, including Great Britain (Theresa Wallach was the first international vice president) and Australia where the branch was started by Hazel Mayes. It was the first organization to recognize all women in the sport. Currently spanning 39 countries, it is purportedly the largest motorcycle association for women in the world. The group is known for organising annual "Pink Ribbon Rides" to raise awareness for breast cancer.

National Divisions 
The national divisions in October 2020:

°AUSTRALIA
°AUSTRIA
°BANGLADESH
°BELGIUM
°BULGARIA
°CANADA
°CURAÇAO
°DENMARK
°ESTONIA
°FINLAND
°FRANCE
°GERMANY
°GREAT BRITAIN
°GREECE
°HUNGARY
°INDIA
°ITALY
°JAPAN
°KOREA
°LITHUANIA
°LUXEMBOURG
°MEXICO
°MALAYSIA
°MOROCCO
°NETHERLANDS
°NEPAL
°NEW ZEALAND
°NORWAY
°PAKISTAN
°POLAND
°ROMANIA
°SWEDEN
°SWITZERLAND
°THAILAND
°UKRAINE
°UNITED ARAB EMIRATES
°USA

Bibliography
 Easy Motorcycle Riding. Wallach, Theresa. New York, Sterling, 1970. 
 The Rugged Road. Theresa Wallach, Panther Publications, 2010

References

External links
 

Motorcycle clubs
Women motorcyclists
Women's clubs in Australia
Women's clubs in the United States